Doorman (DeMarr Davis) is a fictional mutant superhero appearing in American comic books published by Marvel Comics.

Publication history
Created by John Byrne, Doorman first appeared in West Coast Avengers #46 in 1989.

Fictional character biography
Little is known of Doorman's life before he responded to Mr. Immortal's advertisement for the hero team that would eventually become the Great Lakes Avengers. It has been revealed, however, that he is a mutant and is African-American.

Before joining the Great Lakes Avengers, DeMarr Davis was an average American. Sometime during his years in college, DeMarr's mother died. After completing four years of college and three years of graduate school, DeMarr decided to answer Mr. Immortal's newspaper ad asking "costumed adventurers" to work together and form a team. DeMarr, being a mutant with a unique teleporting ability, is able to allow his teammates entrance into almost any structure. He was a founding member of the Great Lakes Avengers.

He was first seen in public with the team by Hawkeye and Mockingbird, who later agreed to become their mentors. With the team, he helped Hawkeye and the West Coast Avengers against "That Which Endures". They also assisted Mockingbird in a holding action against Terminus. After aiding the Thunderbolts against the villain Graviton, the team clashed with the mercenary Deadpool.

Doorman is, however, the most cynical of the Great Lakes Avengers, constantly comparing the team to the real Avengers, usually at inappropriate times, and sometimes feeling embarrassed by his friends. Nonetheless, DeMarr cares for them deeply, and values each and every member of the team.

GLA: Misassembled
During the G.L.A. mini-series, the team took on Maelstrom who was trying to destroy the universe. After Dinah Soar's death, Mr. Immortal suffers a nervous break down leading Flatman and Doorman to search for new members. They went to New York City, where they failed to recruit a number of heroes. While in Central Park, they're saved by Squirrel Girl and her sidekick Monkey Joe from muggers. They offer to recruit her in the team and she accepts. Later, they hear an alarm on a nearby factory and encounter the Grasshopper, who was battling Batroc the Leaper and his minions. During the battle, Flatman offers to recruit him and Grasshopper quickly accepts, only to be instantly killed by Zaran, one of Batroc's minions, who threw a sai that passed through Doorman and landed on his head. DeMarr feels that it is his fault that Grasshopper died and therefore sunk into a slight depression. During this time, he also tried to scare Squirrel Girl off the team, because he feared that she would also die while in service to the GLA, but he later apologizes to her.

During the final battle, Doorman gets killed, sacrificing himself so that Mr. Immortal could stop Maelstrom. In the afterlife, he met the other deceased GLA members including Grasshopper who forgave him. Doorman was, however, intrigued by the absence of Hawkeye, until Mockingbird tells him that he became the new Swordsman. Shortly afterwards, the cosmic entity Oblivion summoned him declaring that he could prove useful to him because of his connection to the Darkforce Dimension, akin to Deathurge, who had been recently captured by Mr. Immortal. Doorman therefore replaced Deathurge and became Oblivion's new angel of death. Taking Deathurge's place, Doorman took Maelstrom to the afterlife, after he was tricked into killing himself by Mr. Immortal, and was able to return to the GLA. As a servant of Oblivion, he is able to summon skis to fly and is intangible. Doorman continues to be a member of the GLA. After he helped his friends save the universe from Maelstrom, he understands the team's importance and has a newfound respect for them. After receiving a subpoena from the real Avengers and discovering that they were all mutants, the team decided to change their name to the Great Lakes X-Men, complete with new costumes.

GLX-Mas Special
During the GLX-Mas Special, the team confronted Dr. Tannenbaum, who had released an army of living Christmas trees on the citizens of Wisconsin. Later, Doorman informed the team that he had to go and visit his father. Upon reaching his father's house, his father quickly complained that DeMarr was throwing his life away and needed to join the real world. He told his son that he had "stupid powers" and "all the other heroes have better powers than you". Realizing that his own happiness was more important than his father's respect, DeMarr finally admitted the truth to his father: that he had died and came back as an angel of death. He had not come back to visit his father but rather to collect his soul, as he had fallen off the roof while setting up Christmas lights and died. The revelation of DeMarr's new role in the universe greatly pleased his father, who couldn't wait to brag to all his friends in heaven about how his son was the new angel of death.

Great Lakes Champions
The team participated in a charity superhero poker tournament hosted by the Thing, where Flatman beat their host in the final round. Flatman's status as champion inspired the team to rename themselves the Great Lakes Champions, after being discouraged from affiliation with both the X-Men and the Defenders by members of those teams present at the tournament, ignoring the protests of former Champions of Los Angeles member Hercules.

Civil War/The Initiative

All of the Great Lakes Champions have registered with the United States government as required by the Superhuman Registration Act, as revealed when Deadpool mistakenly attempted to apprehend them for violating the Act, only to be defeated and informed that they had already registered.

DeMarr has been identified as one of the 142 registered superheroes who appear on the cover of the comic book Avengers: The Initiative #1.

Doorman and his teammates became the Initiative group in charge of Wisconsin, calling themselves the Great Lakes Initiative. They were given a rescue mission to save Dionysus after he fell from Mount Olympus and was captured by A.I.M., who planned to use his powers to cause mental instability on all the superheroes they consider a threat. During the task, Deadpool ambushes Mr. Immortal and Flatman. Flatman recruited him as a reserve member of the team but the mercenary eventually overstayed his welcome. After many failed attempts, Deadpool is kicked out of the group by Squirrel Girl.

Secret Invasion
During the Secret Invasion storyline, the team confronted a Skrull disguised as Grasshopper, with help from Gravity and Catwalk. They later appeared to welcome Gravity as leader of the team, after he was transferred to Wisconsin by Norman Osborn.

Fear Itself
During the Fear Itself storyline, the team confronts Asbestos Man, who takes advantage of the fear and chaos that is happening. None of the group actually wish to touch the man due to the toxicity of his suit. Mr. Immortal talks him into giving up in return for being remembered by the others.

Great Lakes Avengers (2016 series)
In the ongoing series The Great Lakes Avengers, it is revealed that the team had disbanded and gone their separate ways. During that time, Doorman continued on his role as an angel of death. He then meets Flatman and Big Bertha at a local diner, after being informed that the GLA has been reinstated as a permanent addition to the Avengers. They relocate to Detroit, Michigan where they meet a girl named Pansy at their new headquarters, a factory owned by Tony Stark. The team then goes to a local bar to try and convince the owner to turn down the music. The owner, Nain Rogue, instead refuses and begins to insult them, particularly Mr. Immortal and Big Bertha. Upon being arrested after getting into a fight, Doorman escapes and finds Mr. Immortal inside a coffin. He then brings him back to the surface, convincing him to help the others. After Connie Ferrari gets the other Great Lakes Avengers out of the police station, Doorman was present when Goodness Silva was added to the Great Lakes Avengers where she takes on the name of Good Boy. After the team discovers that Dick Snerd shut them down, Mr. Immortal returns and takes Flatman on patrol, while Bertha, Doorman and Good Boy go to Nain Rogue's bar to find clues. Upon entering the bar, Doorman is pulled into the Darkforce Dimension, where Oblivion angrily demands an explanation for his absence. Doorman then goes back to work when he gets a text from Bertha, who was injured while fighting Dr. Nob and his squad. During the battle, Dr. Nod takes more of the weight-loss supplements, becoming much bigger and monstrous. On Mr. Immortal's suggestion, the team performs a maneuver that has Doorman and Mr. Immortal get inside Dr. Nod's body, where Mr. Immortal manages to kill him by punching his heart. After their victory, the team is visited by Deadpool who tells them that they've been fired and can no longer use the Avengers name, leaving them confused.

Powers and abilities
Doorman has the ability to teleport people or objects through solid matter with his own body that serves as a portal of sorts. His mutant powers operates by tapping into the Darkforce Dimension. Originally, his all-black appearance was a costume of apparently conventional material with stark white eyepieces in the mask as contrast. However, since becoming Oblivion's servant, his "body" seems to be an assumed shape rather than a simple costume and he can transform into it at will. As the Angel of Death, he possesses mediumship, Darkforce constructs, lightspeed flight, and supernatural durability.

DeMarr had some unarmed combat training and is an experienced card player.

Appearance
After dying and being resurrected by Oblivion to become its new "angel of death", Doorman's appearance has changed as he now possesses white gloves, boots, a cape, and skis: the trademarks of his predecessor, Deathurge. In fact, the only difference in appearance from Deathurge are the white "eyes" that were once the eyepieces of his original costume.

References

External links
Doorman at Marvel.com

African-American superheroes
Avengers (comics) characters
Characters created by John Byrne (comics)
Comics characters introduced in 1989
Fictional characters who can manipulate darkness or shadows
Fictional characters who can turn intangible
Fictional characters with immortality
Fictional characters with superhuman durability or invulnerability
Fictional personifications of death
Marvel Comics characters who can teleport
Marvel Comics mutants
Marvel Comics superheroes